Pseudomeritastis quieta is a species of moth of the family Tortricidae. It is found in Peru.

The wingspan is about 25 mm. The ground colour of the forewings is ash grey with brownish grey strigulation (fine streaks) and brown ferruginous markings, spotted and reticulated (a net-like pattern) with brown. The hindwings are pale orange cream, darkening towards the apex.

Etymology
The species name refers to the colouration of the species and is derived from Latin quieta (meaning quiet).

References

Moths described in 2010
Euliini